WWRI-LP was an FM radio station broadcasting on 95.1 MHz, licensed to Coventry, Rhode Island. The WWRI-LP license is owned by the Marconi Broadcasting Foundation. The station has been off the air and silent since October 1, 2020 at 5:30 p.m., when its programming moved to WPVD. Prior to leaving the air, WWRI-LP had broadcast a classic rock format. The station began broadcasting February 9, 2016. WWRI-LP was managed by Chris DiPaola, owner of WBLQ (1230) and manager of WSUB-LP ("96.7 the Buzz") in Westerly, Rhode Island. WWRI-LP had local community members on air each day, such as John Parente, Johnny Mac & more. Long-time radio DJ Kickin' Al was the afternoon drive host from 2016 to 2019. January 2020 marked the start of the station's local community morning show, "Mac & Boots In The Morning", hosted by Johnny Mac & John Botello.

References

External links
I-95.1 website

Radio stations established in 2016
2016 establishments in Rhode Island
Classic rock radio stations in the United States
WRI-LP
Coventry, Rhode Island
Community radio stations in the United States